Azalein is a chemical compound. It is a flavonol, a type of flavonoid. It is the  3-O-α-L-rhamnoside of azaleatin. It can be found in the flowers of Plumbago and Rhododendron species.

References 

O-methylated flavonols
Flavonol rhamnosides